Julio Victorio De Rissio (10 November 1916 – 26 December 2013), better known by the stage name of Dr. Tangalanga, was a popular Argentine comedian known for his humorous prank phone calls to unsuspecting recipients.

Career 
Born in the Balvanera neighbourhood of Buenos Aires to Italian Argentine immigrants, De Rissio worked in a shoe factory during his early years. He began recording prank calls in the mid-1960s to provide comic relief for a bedridden friend. He released over 40 albums of prank calls since 1989, selling over 250 thousand copies, arguably becoming the most famous prank call artist in the Spanish speaking world. He made extensive use of Argentine Lunfardo vernacular, and his tapes have been praised by critics as varied as humorist Carlos Loiseau and philosopher Alejandro Rozitchner.

Style 

Tangalanga initiates prank-calls using a slow-paced, almost erudite, turn of phrase to inquire about a product or service advertised in a newspaper. He bewilders victims with nonsensical and inflammatory remarks, leading them to anger and confusion, igniting a verbal altercation. Key to his comedic success was the use of "ad hominen" attacks, which he levied against his casualties without hesitation. For instance, after a brief and seemingly bening interaction, Tangalanga would question the sexual orientation of his caller, arguing that either their tone of voice or conversation manners were signs of a closeted lifestyle. A notable example is a call to a group of gay adult workers offering full-body massages (aka "masofilaxia"), which culminated in reciprocal accusations of deviant behavior.

Tangalanga's targets were picked at random or from tips from his audience. While he did not have a specific victim profile in mind, he gravitated towards short-tempered personalities. Frequent targets were adult-workers, palm-readers, mechanics, loan sharks, pizzeria employees, construction workers and parking-garage attendants.

A hallmark of Tangalanga's style was the use of various alter-egos, like Tarufetti, Varela, Santoro, Rigatuzzo, or Cadorna. In just about every set-up, he would raise a fictitious complaint about the poor quality of services offered to his brother or nephew. In a notable example, he said: "My nephew went to get two "matafuegos" (Spanish for fire extinguisher; literally: fire-killer) for the car, but it didn't kill the fire or even injure it". The resulting quarrel ranks that call as one of his most memorable in 40 years.

Fitness Center Saga 
Beginning in 1988 Tangalanga made various calls to Octavio, a gym manager. The first call was published in "Dr. Tangalanga es mundial" with Octavio appearing in a few other compilations that followed. There were a total of 12 calls - the last-one was performed live in 2011.

Discography 
Los llamados telefónicos del Dr. Tangalanga vol. 1 (1989)
Los llamados telefónicos del Dr. Tangalanga vol. 2 (1990)
Los llamados telefónicos del Dr. Tangalanga vol. 3 (1990)
Los llamados telefónicos del Dr. Tangalanga vol. 4 (1990)
Los llamados telefónicos del Dr. Tangalanga vol. 5 (1991)
Los llamados telefónicos del Dr. Tangalanga vol. 6 (1991)
Los llamados telefónicos del Dr. Tangalanga vol. 7 (1991)
Los llamados telefónicos del Dr. Tangalanga vol. 8 (1992)
Los llamados telefónicos del Dr. Tangalanga vol. 9 (1993)
Los llamados inéditos del Dr. Tangalanga vol. 1 (1994)
Los llamados inéditos del Dr. Tangalanga vol. 2 (1995)
Los llamados inéditos del Dr. Tangalanga vol. 3 (1995)
Los llamados inéditos del Dr. Tangalanga vol. 4 (1996)
Dr. Tangalanga: Cuentos con amigos (1996)
Los mejores llamados telefónicos del Dr. Tangalanga vol. 1 (1996)
Los mejores llamados telefónicos del Dr. Tangalanga vol. 2 (1996)
Los mejores llamados telefónicos del Dr. Tangalanga vol. 3 (1997)
Los llamados de oro del Dr. Tangalanga (1997)
Dr. Tangalanga es mundial, first Octavio's appearance (1998)
Dr. Tangalanga en vivo (1998)
Dr. Tangalanga: Llamados violentos (1998)
Dr. Tangalanga: Cuentos con amigos (1998)
Dr. Tangalanga: Colección privada vol. 1 (1998)
Dr. Tangalanga: Colección privada vol. 2 (1998)
Dr. Tangalanga: Colección privada vol. 3 (1999)
Dr. Tangalanga: Colección privada vol. 4 (1999)
De parte de Tangalanga (2000-2001)
Tangalanga ataca de nuevo (2002)
¿En qué sentido me lo dice? (2002)
¿Me da su teléfono? (2003)
WANTED (por matar de risa) (comp. 1980 - 1999) (2003)
40 Años Currando - Solo editado en Mexico - Para el show del Hard Rock Cafe, only released in Mexico (2004)
Tangalanga en México (2004)
Maestro 2005 (2005)
10 de noviembre de 2006 La Trastienda Club (Official Bootleg) (2006)
Noventa pirulos y todavía te rompo (2006)
Rioplatense (2006)
Te sobra un número (2007)
¿Me puedo tomar confianza? (2007)
¡Olé, olé, olé! ¡Doctor! ¡Doctor! (2008)
Mil gracias Uruguay (2008)
Dr. Tangalanga: Colección privada vol. 5 (comp.) (2009)
Dr. Tangalanga: Trapisondas (2010)
Dr. Tangalanga: cuentos con amigos 2 (2010)
Dr. Tangalanga: Tejemanejes (2011)

External links
 Official website

References
90 Tangalangas (Página/12). 
"Tal vez ya sea un poco conocido" (Clarín).
Argentina answers to the crazy call of Dr. Tangalanga, Matt Moffett. The Wall Street Journal. December 15, 2007.

1916 births
2013 deaths
20th-century Argentine writers
20th-century Argentine male writers
Argentine comedians
Argentine people of Italian descent
Prank calling
Writers from Buenos Aires
20th-century pseudonymous writers